The 2007 NBA Development League expansion draft was the second expansion draft of the National Basketball Association Development League (NBADL). The draft was held on September 5, 2007, so that the newly founded Rio Grande Valley Vipers, Fort Wayne Mad Ants, Utah Flash and Iowa Energy could acquire players for the upcoming 2007–08 season. Players from the final 2006–07 rosters of the Arkansas RimRockers and Fort Worth Flyers, as well as all other unprotected NBADL players, were available to have their rights selected in the 2007 expansion draft. A random drawing was held to determine the draft order and the Vipers won the first overall pick. The draft comprised 10 rounds where each team switched their selection order; for example, the Iowa Energy chose last in Round 1 (fourth overall) but were able to select first in Round 2 (fifth overall).

J. R. Pinnock, a guard, was the first overall expansion draft selection. He was one of three players to have also been chosen in an NBA Draft (2006) along with James Lang (2003) and Denham Brown (2006). Through the 2009–10 NBA D-League season, eight total players from the 2007 expansion draft have been named an NBA D-League All-Star at least once, including Jeremy Richardson, Will Conroy, Curtis Stinson, Antonio Meeking, Clay Tucker, Desmon Farmer, Walker Russell, Jr. and Luke Schenscher. Oddly, none of the three NBA Draft picks have ever been named NBA D-League All-Stars.

Key

Draft

References
General

Specific

draft
NBA G League expansion draft
Iowa Energy
Fort Wayne Mad Ants
Utah Flash
Rio Grande Valley Vipers